Kelli Brianne Garner (born April 11, 1984) is an American actress who has appeared in a variety of independent and mainstream films, television, and theater. 

A native of Southern California, Garner made her feature film debut at age seventeen in Larry Clark's thriller Bully (2001), followed by a supporting role as Faith Domergue in Martin Scorsese's The Aviator (2004). In 2005, she made her New York stage debut in an Off-Broadway production of Dog Sees God. Over the following several years, Garner had lead roles in the independent film Thumbsucker (2005), the studio comedy Man of the House (2005), and the comedy-drama  Lars and the Real Girl (2007). She returned to theater in 2008, appearing in an Off-Broadway production of The Seagull opposite Dianne Wiest.

Garner subsequently had a supporting role in the Disney animated film G-Force (2009), and from 2011 to 2012, had a lead role on the short-lived period drama Pan Am, portraying a flight attendant. She later co-starred in Alexandre Aja's fantasy horror film Horns (2014) opposite Daniel Radcliffe. In 2015, Garner portrayed Marilyn Monroe in the television film The Secret Life of Marilyn Monroe, opposite Susan Sarandon. She subsequently guest-starred on the series Looking (2014–2015) before starring as the lead on the NBC drama series The Enemy Within, which ran for one season in 2019. She also had a minor role in the monster film Godzilla: King of the Monsters (2019).

Early life
Garner was born on April 11, 1984, in Bakersfield, California, and spent her early childhood in Newbury Park before her family settled in Thousand Oaks. Although she described herself as a "shy" young girl, Garner caught the attention of a talent agent while attending a friend's bar mitzvah, and was subsequently cast in an Eggo commercial. While a student at Thousand Oaks High School, Garner was cast in director Mike Mills's short film Architecture of Assurance in 2000. Garner was a talented soccer player in high school, and had planned on pursuing it as a career before she began working as an actress.

Career
Garner had appeared in several short films before being cast in a supporting role in the television film Time Share in 2000. In 2001, she was cast in Larry Clark's controversial crime thriller Bully (2001), in which she portrayed Heather Swallers, a teenager who participates with her friends in an orchestrated murder of one of their peers; Clark cast Garner in the film after seeing her performance in Mike Mills's short Architecture of Assurance. The film, which was based on the real-life 1993 murder of Bobby Kent, received critical acclaim.

Her next major role came at age nineteen in Martin Scorsese's The Aviator (2004), in which she portrayed actress Faith Domergue, opposite Leonardo DiCaprio as Howard Hughes. According to Garner, she wore brown contact lenses to her audition in order to further embody Domergue; she has said that she tripped and fell when entering the audition room in front of director Scorsese and star DiCaprio. "I thought I'd lost the job," she recalled, "But I think it was that moment that made it work [because] the character was someone who was trying to be much older than she was." The following year, she appeared in the comedy Man of the House, and the independent teen drama Thumbsucker (2005), opposite Lou Taylor Pucci and Vince Vaughn. She had supporting parts in the independent films London (2005) and Dreamland (2006), the latter of which earned her a Best Actress award at Method Fest Independent Film Festival, shared with co-star Agnes Bruckner.

In December 2005, Garner starred in the Off-Broadway production of Dog Sees God: Confessions of a Teenage Blockhead at the Century Center for the Performing Arts, co-starring with America Ferrara, Eddie Kaye Thomas, and Ari Graynor, among others. She later appeared in the Green Day music video, "Jesus of Suburbia" (with Thumbsucker co-star Lou Taylor Pucci). 

In 2007, Garner appeared in a lead role in the critically acclaimed drama Lars and the Real Girl as Ryan Gosling's co-worker and love interest. In 2008, she appeared again onstage in an Off-Broadway production of Anton Chekhov's The Seagull opposite Dianne Wiest, as Nina. Ben Brantley of The New York Times, though critical of some elements of the production, praised Garner's performance among her younger co-stars. She had a minor part in the comedy Taking Woodstock (2009), and in the Disney film G-Force (2009), which she followed with a supporting role in Going the Distance (2010), opposite Drew Barrymore. Between 2011 and 2012, she had a main role as Kate Cameron on the period series Pan Am, opposite Christina Ricci.

Garner was next cast in Alexandre Aja's horror-fantasy Horns (2014) with Daniel Radcliffe, and played the title role in the Lifetime mini-series The Secret Life of Marilyn Monroe, opposite Susan Sarandon as her mother. She also appeared in the independent film One More Time (2015) with Christopher Walken and Amber Heard. Between 2014 and 2015, she had a guest-starring role on the gay-themed series Looking, playing the sister of the lead character, Patrick Murray. In 2019, Garner had a supporting part in the action film Godzilla: King of the Monsters, and also starred as a lead opposite Jennifer Carpenter and Morris Chestnut on the series  The Enemy Within.

Filmography

Film

Television

Music videos

Stage credits

References

External links

 

1984 births
20th-century American actresses
21st-century American actresses
Actresses from Bakersfield, California
American child actresses
American film actresses
American stage actresses
American television actresses
Living people
People from Thousand Oaks, California